Krausz is a German language surname. Notable people with the name include:

Adrienne Krausz (born 1967), Hungarian pianist
Andor Kraszna-Krausz (1904-1989), Hungarian-British writer
Ernest Krausz (1931-2018), Israeli professor
Ferenc Krausz (born 1962), Hungarian-born Austrian physicist
Gergely Krausz (born 1993), Hungarian badminton player
Ilona Vincze-Krausz (1902-1998), Hungarian-Israeli teacher
Michael Krausz (born 1942), Swiss-born American philosopher
Nikolett Krausz (born 1981), Hungarian artistic gymnast
Peter Krausz (born 1946), Romanian-born Canadian artist
Robert Krausz (1936-2002), Israeli trader

See also
Kraus
Krause
Krauss
Krauze

German-language surnames